Memecylon corticosum is a species of plant in the family Melastomataceae. It is endemic to Peninsular Malaysia. It is threatened by habitat loss.

References

corticosum
Endemic flora of Peninsular Malaysia
Conservation dependent plants
Taxonomy articles created by Polbot